The discography of Conway Twitty and Loretta Lynn consists of 10 studio albums, seven compilation albums, 13 singles, and two charted B-sides. While signed to Decca and MCA as solo artists, Twitty and Lynn charted 12 duet singles in the top ten of the Billboard Hot Country Singles chart, including five number one hits.

Studio albums

Compilations

Singles

Charted B-sides

See also
Conway Twitty discography
Loretta Lynn albums discography
Loretta Lynn singles discography

References

Country music discographies
Discography
 
 
Discographies of American artists